Archiac is a commune in the Charente-Maritime department in the Nouvelle-Aquitaine region of southwestern France.

The inhabitants of the commune are known as Archiacais or Archiacaises.

Geography
Archiac is located in the south of the department of Charente Maritime in the historic region of Saintonge some 20 km south of Cognac, 15 km north-west of Barbezieux-Saint-Hilaire and 15 km north-east of Jonzac. The village has the status of a town and is located at the intersection of two main highways: the D699 from Arthenac in the south-west to Ambleville in the north-east; and the D731 from Cierzac in the north-west which continues south-east from the village. The north-eastern border of the commune is also the border between Charente-Maritime and Charente departments. Other access roads include the D149 which is a short-cut connection between the D699 and the D733 west of the village and the D152 which goes south from the village to Saint-Maigrin. There are also the hamlets of La Grue and Saint-Pierre north-east of the village. Apart from some wooded areas near the village the commune is entirely farmland.

Neighbouring communes and villages

History

In the reign of Charlemagne Archiac was the seat of a viguerie.
Upon the removal of Emma, the wife of the lord of Cognac, by the lord of Barbezieux in the 11th  century, the Lord of Archiac gave them asylum: the castle was attacked, taken, and burnt.
In 1219 the Lord of Archiac was Guillaume d'Archiac. During the Hundred Years War the castle was taken and retaken then became a den of Anglo-Gascon thieves before being taken and demolished.
In 1609 the Barony of Archiac was raised to a marquisate.
It was forbidden for the Protestant ministers Jacques Fountaines and Jean Hoummeau to preach and the temple was demolished in 1673.

Heraldry

Administration

List of successive mayors

Demography
In 2017 the commune had 772 inhabitants. Arthenac was part of the Archiac commune until they were separated in 1831; the population data given in the table and graph below for 1821 and earlier include the commune of Arthenac.

Distribution of age groups
The population of the town is older than the departmental average.

Percentage distribution of age groups in Archiac and Charente-Maritime Department in 2017

Source: INSEE

Sites and monuments

The Parish Church of Saint-Pierre has a fragment of a statue from the Middle Ages depicting a mitred head  which is registered as an historical object.
A dolmen near Lavaure
A chateau from the 9th century, repaired in the 11th century but now disappeared. It included the chapels of Our Lady and Saint-Martin.
The House of the Vine and Fragrances

Notable people linked to the commune
 Cardinal Simon d'Archiac (14th century), born in Archiac

See also
Communes of the Charente-Maritime department

References

External links
Archiac on the National Geographic Institute website 
Archiac on Géoportail, National Geographic Institute (IGN) website 
Archiac on the 1750 Cassini Map

Communes of Charente-Maritime
Arrondissement of Jonzac